Afrolittorina africana is a species of sea snail, a marine gastropod mollusk in the family Littorinidae, the winkles or periwinkles.

Distribution
East coast of Africa south to and including KwaZulu-Natal.

References

africana
Gastropods described in 1847